Lady Mary Elizabeth Peters,  (born 6 July 1939) is a Northern Irish former athlete, best known as a competitor in the pentathlon and shot put. Peters was named as Lady Companion of the Order of the Garter on 27 February 2019. She was installed in St. George's Chapel, the chapel of the Order, on Garter Day, 17 June.

Early life and education
Peters was born in Halewood, Lancashire, but moved to Ballymena (and later Belfast) at age eleven when her father's job was relocated to Northern Ireland. She now lives in Derriaghy, within the Lisburn and Castlereagh district, just outside Belfast.

As a teenager, her father encouraged her athletic career by building her home practice facilities as birthday gifts. She qualified as a teacher and worked while training.

Athletics career

After Ballymena, the family moved to Portadown where she attended Portadown College. The headmaster Donald Woodman and PE teacher Kenneth McClelland introduced her to athletics with Mr McClelland her first coach. She was head girl of the school in 1956.

In the 1972 Summer Olympics in Munich, Peters competing for Great Britain and Northern Ireland and won the gold medal in the women's pentathlon.  She had finished 4th in 1964 and 9th in 1968.  To win the gold medal, she narrowly beat the local favourite, West Germany's Heide Rosendahl, by 10 points, setting a world record score. After her victory, death threats were phoned into the BBC: "Mary Peters is a Protestant and has won a medal for Britain. An attempt will be made on her life and it will be blamed on the IRA ... Her home will be going up in the near future." But Peters insisted she would return home to Belfast. She was greeted by fans and a band at the airport and paraded through the city streets, but was not allowed back in her flat for three months. Turning down jobs in the US and Australia, where her father lived, she insisted on remaining in Northern Ireland.

In 1972, Peters won the BBC Sports Personality of the Year award.  "Peters, a 33-year-old secretary from Belfast, won Britain's only athletics gold at the Munich Olympics. The pentathlon competition was decided on the final event, the 200m, and Peters claimed the title by one-tenth of a second."

She represented Northern Ireland at every Commonwealth Games between 1958 and 1974. In these games she won 2 gold medals for the pentathlon, plus a gold and silver medal for the shot put.

After athletics
Peters became a Trustee of The Outward Bound Trust in May 2001 and is Vice-President of the Northern Ireland Outward Bound Association. She is also Patron of Springhill Hospice in Rochdale, Greater Manchester.

The Mary Peters Trust
Peters established a charitable Sports Trust in 1975 (now known as the Mary Peters Trust) to support talented young sportsmen and women, both able-bodied and disabled, from across Northern Ireland in a financial and advisory capacity. The trust has made a large number of awards and has list of well known alumni including Graeme McDowell, Rory McIlroy, Jonathan Rea, Darren Clarke, David Humphreys, Bethany Firth, Ryan Burnett, Carl Frampton, Paddy Barnes, Michael Conlan, Kelly Gallagher, Michael McKillop, Dr Janet Gray.

Honours
Peters was appointed a Member of the Order of the British Empire (MBE) for services to athletics in the 1973 New Year Honours. For services to sport, she was promoted in the same Order to Commander (CBE) in the 1990 Birthday Honours and again to Dame Commander (DBE) in the 2000 Birthday Honours. In the 2015 New Year Honours, she was awarded as Member of the Order of the Companions of Honour (CH), also for services to sport and the community in Northern Ireland, and in 2017, she was made a Dame of the Order of Saint John (DStJ).  Peters was appointed a Lady Companion of the Order of the Garter (LG) on 27 February 2019, and therefore granted the tile lady.

Northern Ireland's premier athletics track, on the outskirts of Belfast, is named after her. A statue of her stands within it.

In April 2009 she was named the Lord Lieutenant of the City of Belfast, retiring from the post in 2014 when she was succeeded by Fionnuala Jay-O'Boyle. Peters is a Freeman of the Cities of Lisburn and Belfast.

Arms

References

External links
 Mary Peters Track, Belfast (picture)
 Northern Irish Athletics website, entry for Mary Peters
 BBC biography
 Dame Mary Peters' curriculum vitae

1939 births
Living people
People from Halewood
Sportspeople from Ballymena
Sportspeople from Belfast
British female shot putters
Female athletes from Northern Ireland
Shot putters from Northern Ireland
Pentathletes from Northern Ireland
Olympic athletes of Great Britain
Olympic gold medallists for Great Britain
Athletes (track and field) at the 1964 Summer Olympics
Athletes (track and field) at the 1968 Summer Olympics
Athletes (track and field) at the 1972 Summer Olympics
Commonwealth Games gold medallists for Northern Ireland
Commonwealth Games silver medallists for Northern Ireland
Commonwealth Games medallists in athletics
Athletes (track and field) at the 1958 British Empire and Commonwealth Games
Athletes (track and field) at the 1962 British Empire and Commonwealth Games
Athletes (track and field) at the 1966 British Empire and Commonwealth Games
Athletes (track and field) at the 1970 British Commonwealth Games
Athletes (track and field) at the 1974 British Commonwealth Games
Ladies Companion of the Garter
Members of the Order of the Companions of Honour
Dames Commander of the Order of the British Empire
Order of Saint John (chartered 1888)
Deputy Lieutenants in Northern Ireland
Sporting dames
Lord-Lieutenants of Belfast
BBC Sports Personality of the Year winners
People educated at Portadown College
Medalists at the 1972 Summer Olympics
Olympic gold medalists in athletics (track and field)
Medallists at the 1966 British Empire and Commonwealth Games
Medallists at the 1970 British Commonwealth Games
Medallists at the 1974 British Commonwealth Games